The National Olympic Committee of Pakistan was created in 1948. Pakistan first participated at the Paralympic Games in 1992, and has sent athletes to compete in every Summer Paralympic Games since then. Pakistan has won three medals, a silver, a bronze and a gold medal in the Paralympic Games. All three medals have come courtesy of Haider Ali in the Men's Long Jump and Discus Throw events. Pakistan has never participated in the Winter Paralympic Games.

History

Pakistan won its first Paralympics medal at the 2008 Summer Paralympics when Haider Ali clinched a Silver medal in the F-37/38 Category of the men’s long jump, his last jump of 6.44 meters was a joint world record with the Tunisian athlete Farhat Chida, however, Farhat had six valid jumps, while Haider had four, so he had to settle for the Silver medal. He also came 4th in the Men's discus throw F37–38 event.

At the 2016 Summer Paralympics Haider Ali won a Bronze medal in the Men's Long Jump - T37 event. He was also the flag bearer for Pakistan during the opening ceremony of the Rio Paralympics. But his best moment came during the 2020 Summer Paralympics when he won a Gold medal in the Men's Discus Throw - F37 event.

Medal tables

Medals by Games

Medals by sports

List of Medalists

Milestones

Firsts 

First Medal: 2008 Beijing, Haider Ali, Men's Long Jump - F37/38
First Gold Medal: 2020 Tokyo, Haider Ali, Men's Discus Throw - F37
First Individual Multi-medallist: Haider Ali, 2008 Beijing, 2016 Rio and 2020 Tokyo

Multiple Medalists

See also
 Pakistan at the Olympics
 Pakistan at the Commonwealth Games
 Pakistan at the Asian Games

References

 
History of sport in Pakistan